Vara is a locality and the seat of Vara Municipality, Västra Götaland County, Sweden with 4,235 inhabitants in 2019.

Notable landmarks include the concert hall, the artwork on the train station called Blue Orange, Bengtssonska granary, and a folk high school.

References 

Populated places in Västra Götaland County
Populated places in Vara Municipality
Municipal seats of Västra Götaland County
Swedish municipal seats